El Carrascal is a station on Line 12 of the Madrid Metro. It is located in fare Zone B1.  Is a below grade metro or light-rail station and underground structure. The project is located in Leganés, Madrid.

References 

Line 12 (Madrid Metro) stations
Buildings and structures in Leganés
Railway stations in Spain opened in 2003